The following is a list of situation comedy series that have been ranked among some of the worst series in television history. With the possible exception of reality television, the sitcom genre constitutes the largest category of poorly received television shows, with a long list of critically unsuccessful productions.

0–9 

1600 Penn: The 2012 NBC sitcom 1600 Penn, about a dysfunctional family living in the White House, was canceled after one season of 13 episodes due to poor ratings. The New York Post, the Miami New Times, Complex, and the Orange County Register named it among the worst shows of the 2012–13 season. The A.V. Club wrote in its review, "Family comedies have become classics and thrived based on similarly simple ideas ... like blended families and differing socioeconomic backgrounds, but at least those shows were funny. 1600 Penn is not." Variety commented that the show's "uneven execution should leave viewers feeling as divided as the country." Tim Surette of TV.com wrote that show co-creator and star Josh Gad's performance "is so grating that he should be used in the War on Terror to flush out evildoers." The Oregonian, in 2016, named it the worst TV show about politics, and Rob Sheffield of Rolling Stone deemed it the "worst of all the nightmarishly bad shows set in the White House" the same year. The Wrap included 1600 Penn among their "31 Worst Sitcoms of All Time" in 2018.

A 

AfterMASH: AfterMASH premiered in the fall of 1983 in the same Monday night 9:00 P.M. EST time slot as its predecessor M*A*S*H. It finished 10th out of all network shows for the 1983–1984 season according to Nielsen Media Research television rating. For its second season CBS moved the show to Tuesday nights at 8:00 EST, opposite NBC's top 10 hit The A-Team, and launched a marketing campaign featuring illustrations by Sanford Kossin of Maxwell Klinger in a nurse's uniform, shaving off Mr. T's signature mohawk, theorizing that AfterMASH would take a large portion of The A-Teams audience. The opposite occurred as AfterMASH's ratings plummeted and the show was canceled nine episodes into its second season. In 2002, TV Guide listed the show as the seventh-worst TV series ever. The series was nonetheless nominated for a Primetime Emmy for Outstanding Direction In A Comedy Series for the episode "Fall Out".

All That Glitters: All That Glitters debuted the week of April 18, 1977 on about 40 stations in late-night syndication. It was poorly received by critics, with one reviewer going so far as to call the show's theme song "blasphemous" for suggesting that God was female and created Eve first. Time magazine sharply criticized the series, calling it "embarrassingly amateurish", with "flaccid" and "wearying" jokes, flat writing, "mediocre" acting and "aimless" direction. The Wall Street Journal concurred, writing that while the series' role-reversal premise may have been adequate for a play or film, it was too limiting to serve as the basis for a continuing series. These limitations showed up most clearly, the Journal says, in the lead performances. Although praising the performers themselves as talented, they are cited for being "unable to infuse much life into their roles". The Journal pegs the fundamental problem with All That Glitters as that "its characters are not people at all, merely composites of the least attractive characteristics of each sex. The satire focuses not on the way real, recognizable people behave, but on stereotypes and cliches about masculine and feminine attitudes. Even when stood on their heads, they still remain stereotypes and cliches." New Times Magazine was much more receptive to the series. Although labeling it "unquestionably the weirdest [show] that Norman Lear has ever produced", New Times found that the series was not "a satire of mannerisms but of attitudes". All That Glitters required that viewers watch closely to pick up on the subtleties and nuances, "not so much for what the show says, but for the way that it's said". All That Glitters, after initially capturing 20% of viewers in major markets in its opening weeks, had lost about half of that audience midway through its run. The series was cancelled after 13 weeks, last airing on July 15, 1977. Although the show was panned, it and Lear, along with Mary Hartman, Mary Hartman, are credited with expanding the subject matter that television producers were able to explore with lessened fear of antagonizing sponsors or viewers. In the years since the series, it has garnered something of a positive reputation, with one critic listing it and other Lear efforts as "imaginative shows that contained some of the most striking satires of television and American society ever broadcast".

B
Babes in the Wood: This ITV sitcom starring Karl Howman and Denise van Outen ran for two series from 1998 until 1999 and garnered largely negative reviews. Stuart Heritage from The Guardian named it one of the worst ITV shows, and Digital Spy named it one of the five worst UK sitcoms.

Baby Bob: This CBS series, based on a talking baby originally featured on a series of television commercials for Internet service provider FreeInternet.com, was panned by critics, but premiered to strong ratings and placed 15th in its first week, although ratings quickly declined. In 2002 (the same year it premiered), TV Guide ranked Baby Bob number 14 on its '50 Worst TV Shows of All Time' list.

Baby Talk: A short-lived early 1990s American sitcom that also featured a talking baby (voiced by Tony Danza). In 1991, Electronic Media Critics' Poll voted it as the worst series on television. When ABC renewed the show for a second season, lead actress Julia Duffy was released from her contract; she was replaced by Mary Page Keller. Scott Baio, who had watched the first season, agreed with some of the critics' views, but justified his joining the show by comparing it to Happy Days, on which he starred as a teenager. "I did a show for 11 years (Happy Days) that never ever got a good review," said Baio. "So we hope you guys will love it, but we're just going to do the best we can, and it's what the people like that's going to stay on." The series was canceled in the spring of 1992.

Big Top: This 2009 BBC sitcom starring Amanda Holden as a circus ring mistress received largely negative reviews. In a review of the opening episode, Michael Deacon in The Daily Telegraph described it as "unfunny and outdated", writing that "the cast weren't so much playing characters as reading aloud from a dog-eared joke book for half an hour." Tom Sutcliffe in The Independent wrote that it was "one of those programmes that get you wondering about the commissioning process." Sam Wollaston of The Guardian commented that the jokes were so obvious that he invented a game, whereby he would pause the show after the set-up and ask his girlfriend to guess the punchline. The sitcom was named the worst new sitcom of 2009 by the visitors to the British Comedy Guide. Daily Mirror TV critic Jim Shelley included the series on his list of the Top 20 TV flops, describing it as "Mind-blowingly awful". The harsh criticism that the sitcom received and the likelihood that it would be axed after one series led to its being used as a cipher on Richard Bacon's BBC 6Music show during 2009–10. To circumvent instructions given to 6Music presenters that they should not discuss on-air the planned closure of the station, Bacon frequently voiced his strong objection to "the BBC's plans to cancel Big Top" and encouraged listeners to do the same. The series was not recommissioned for a second series and was formally cancelled by the BBC in February 2010. In 2013, when Adam Postans of the Daily Mirror reviewed the first episode of The Wright Way, he wrote that it had surpassed Big Top for the title of the worst sitcom ever.

Bottle Boys: Produced by London Weekend Television for ITV, this series gained a reputation as one of the worst British sitcoms ever produced. Mark Lewisohn, writing in the Radio Times Guide to Comedy observed that "ITV sitcoms had often plumbed the depths, but this was the limit", and noted that Bottle Boys was reputedly despised by comedy executives at ITV. He went on to pick Bottle Boys as the "worst ever" British sitcom. Writer Vince Powell was no stranger to working on controversial shows, having created two of the most controversial comedy shows of the 1970s, Love Thy Neighbour and Mind Your Language. The programme made number 97 in Channel Four's 100 Greatest TV Moments from Hell list show, a retrospective of television's low points of the last fifty years. The Daily Telegraph ranked it #1 in its list of the 10 worst British sitcoms ever made.

The Brighton Belles: Produced by Carlton Television for ITV, this 1993 British adaptation of the popular American series The Golden Girls was both a critical and popular failure in the UK, lasting only six episodes out of ten that were recorded (the remaining four were shown over a year later). It is included in Jeff Evans's list of the twenty worst TV series of all time. The BBC comedy guide wrote about the series' failure: "Why did it fail? Several explanations apply, but the simplest has to be that The Golden Girls itself was already familiar to most British TV watchers ..., and people felt no reason to tune into a UK adaptation delivering the same lines. When an original piece is already nigh-on perfect, and has sated its public, why try to sell a replica? Most transatlantic sitcom adaptations air without the original series having been seen in that territory. To pitch to viewers a carbon copy of an already successful series seems pointless – in hindsight, at least."

Buddies: Comedians Dave Chappelle and Jim Breuer attracted the attention of TV network executives with their guest appearance in the March 14, 1995 episode of ABC's highly rated sitcom Home Improvement. The storyline had Chappelle and Breuer play a duo of friends who appear on Tool Time to ask Tim Taylor advice on their girlfriends. The characters' single outing on the episode proved so popular that ABC decided to give Chappelle and Breuer their own half-hour sitcom. After subsequent rehearsals, Jim Breuer was replaced with Christopher Gartin as Dave Chappelle's "buddy". The unique comic timing and chemistry that Chappelle had with Breuer, his real-life friend, was not present with Gartin, and Breuer's abrupt firing exacerbated ill will. This prevented Chappelle and Gartin from developing the rapport and comedic chemistry necessary for the characters' believability and likeability. Buddies premiered on Tuesday, March 5, 1996, garnering disappointing ratings. When a move to Wednesday night failed to improve its performance, Buddies was off the air on April 3 after a broadcast history of only five episodes out of the 13 that were produced. Dave Chappelle himself was not proud of his involvement with Buddies in retrospect: "It was a bad show. It was bad. I mean when we were doing it, I could tell this was not gonna work." However, the full series was released on DVD in 2005 as a Best Buy exclusive.

C

California Dreams: One of the first teen sitcoms (other than Saved by the Bell) to be produced for the TNBC programming block, California Dreams was universally negatively received. An F-rated review in Entertainment Weekly noted that the show's producer "may have good intentions, but it's hard to imagine what they were." A review in the Los Angeles Times noted the show's lack of originality (a flaw also noted in the Entertainment Weekly review) and deemed that TNBC as a whole was "no improvement" over the Saturday morning cartoons it replaced.

Cavemen: Joe Lawson, who set the show in San Diego, California, adapted it from the GEICO Cavemen commercials, which were also written by Lawson. The 2007 show was described by the network as a "unique buddy comedy that offers a clever twist on stereotypes and turns race relations on its head". In terms of reception from the media the show was "critically savaged". The Chicago Tribune listed it as one of the 25 worst TV shows ever, and Adam Buckman of the New York Post declared the show "extinct on arrival." Ginia Bellafante of the New York Times wrote "I laughed. But I laughed through my pain. Cavemen,' set in some version of San Diego where people speak with Southern accents, doesn't have moments as much as microseconds suspended from any attempt at narrative."Clerks: A pilot for a live-action TV series based on the 1994 Kevin Smith film was produced in 1995. It was produced by Touchstone Television. The pilot only referenced the character names and starred none of the cast from the original film, contained no foul language, and did not feature Silent Bob. The character of Jay was featured, prompting Smith to point out that he owned the character rights to both Jay and Silent Bob (for the purposes of featuring them in separate films). The producers' solution was to change the character's name to Ray. Kevin Smith was unaware of the production of the series until casting was underway. Smith had been in production with Mallrats at the time and attempted to become involved in the series but became disheartened quickly as an episode he had written for the series was shot down. He later used the script for an episode of Clerks: The Animated Series. Brian O'Halloran and Jeff Anderson both auditioned for the role of Dante Hicks (as Anderson's part of Randal Graves from the film had been filled by future SNL performer Jim Breuer). After seeing the result, Smith said that it was terrible, and O'Halloran and Anderson said they were both glad they didn't get the part.Co-Ed Fever: Co-Ed Fever is an American sitcom that aired on CBS in 1979. The series attempted to capitalize on the success of the motion picture National Lampoon's Animal House. It was the third of three "frat house" comedy series to air in early 1979 (the others were NBC's Brothers and Sisters and ABC's Delta House, the latter of which was an authorized spin-off of Animal House). CBS cancelled Co-Ed Fever after only one episode, and all three series were off the air by the end of April 1979. The series was so low-rated it never made it to its regular time slot, Monday night, airing instead as a 'special preview' the night before.(11 February 1979). "Co-Ed Fever" Expires, Bonham Daily Favorite (UPI story) In 2002, Co-Ed Fever ranked number 32 on TV Guides 50 Worst Shows of All Time list.Come Back Mrs. Noah: A BBC television sitcom that aired on BBC1 from 1977 to 1978, joke banter was recycled from other series, and outrageously strange props were used. Come Back Mrs. Noah was not a success, with some regarding it as one of the worst British sitcoms ever made.Come Back Mrs. Noah at the former BBC Guide to Comedy, URL accessed 7 July 2010 The Telegraph ranked it #2 in its list of the ten worst British sitcoms ever made.Coming of Age: A BBC Three programme written by Tim Dawson (who had worked on the similar comedy Two Pints of Lager and a Packet of Crisps), Coming of Age revolved about the lives of six teenagers in Abingdon-on-Thames, England. Coming of Age was criticised for excessive vulgarity and lack of humour. Writing about the first episode, The Daily Telegraphs Culture magazine was negative: "Crudeness abounds... but neither wit nor charm has tagged along for the ride.". Harry Venning in The Stage stated that most of the show's humour "was unremittingly dire" and stated " I sat through Coming Of Age with the will to live seeping from my every pore, leaving me drenched in a puddle of despair. Apparently writer Tim Dawson was 19 when he wrote it, which is about six years older than I would have guessed." Meanwhile, The Scotsman wrote simply: "Coming of Age may be the worst BBC sitcom yet. It is supposedly aimed at teenagers, but I refuse to believe that even the easiest-to-please teenager is happy to accept something so horribly written, horribly acted and horribly vulgar in lieu of actual humour."Coupling (US): This American adaptation of the British sitcom of the same name drew objections over its extensive sexual content, prompting at least two stations (both owned by religious organizations) to not carry the show, and it was pulled from the NBC schedule within two months despite a barrage of publicity. It was also immediately panned as a poor imitation of the original UK series by viewers and critics. BBC America even ran commercials noting that they would play the original British versions on their station just after the American equivalent episodes on NBC aired, so that viewers could see instantly just how superior the original was. Miscasting and stilted delivery of a nearly identical script were believed to be the reasons for the failure though creator Steven Moffat claims the level of network interference was the sole reason. It ranked #7 on Entertainment Weeklys list of TV's 50 biggest bombs and blunders.

DDaddy's Girls: This CBS series followed Dudley Walker (Dudley Moore), the owner of a New York fashion house who loses his wife and his business partner when, after a years-long secret affair, they run off together leaving him as the primary caretaker to his three daughters. The series is notable as the first in which a gay principal character was played by an openly gay actor. Harvey Fierstein played Dennis Sinclair, a high-strung designer at Walker's firm. Although Fierstein earned praise for his performance, Daddy's Girls was hated by critics. New York magazine called the series "Despised, reviled." Entertainment Weekly, somewhat prophetically, found Moore to be "wan and confused." The Dallas Morning News could only say that "Daddy's Girls isn't horrendously bad" but predicted that it would not last until Christmas. Indeed, the series was placed "on hiatus" after only three episodes aired and never returned. Moore never returned to television; he was later diagnosed with progressive supranuclear palsy, which Moore later cited as the cause of his difficulties on the set of the show.Dads: This 2013 Fox multicamera sitcom from Seth MacFarlane received scathing reviews from critics, receiving a score of 15 out of 100 on Metacritic and 0% on Rotten Tomatoes. The network used extracts of the negative reviews ("offensive", "reprehensible", "morally wrong") to promote the show. On May 7, 2014, Fox cancelled it after only one season.Delilah: The series was CBC's first prime-time sitcom, but it generally received poor reviews and negative audience reception. It was cancelled after a single 13-episode season in an era when Canadian content requirements made canceling Canadian programs after so few episodes a rarity. Delilah was one of several CBC flops during the early 1970s, including Corwin and McQueen, the product of inferior creativity. However, CBC's next sitcom, King of Kensington, fared much better and became a multi-year success. Toronto Star television critic Jim Bawden declared the series as the "Worst Canadian Sitcom", declaring the script writing to be "appalling" and discovered an absence of laughter from the audience when he attended a taping of an episode.Don't Call Me Charlie!: Debuting in a US fall 1962 season among a number of sitcoms with wildly unrealistic fantasy premises (The Jetsons and The Beverly Hillbillies would be the only two new sitcoms of that year to have any sort of afterlife), the sitcom featuring a rural veterinarian mistakenly drafted into the armed forces received a scathing review from Rick Du Brow at the time, who chided those responsible for calling the show a comedy, noted that the star of the series was a poor actor, and publicly questioned setting the series in Paris, France, despite having nothing to do with that city (noting that the show eliminated most traces to France after Charles de Gaulle returned to the Presidency). The show was pulled from air partway through its lone season with eight episodes left unaired.

EEmily's Reasons Why Not: The show drew fire from pro-abstinence groups for its inability to properly portray an abstinent person and relying on stereotypes of homosexuality to portray an intentional virgin. It was reported that ABC committed to the show before seeing a script. Despite heavy promotion by both Sony Pictures Television and ABC, the show was pulled after the first episode due to drawing only 6.2 million viewers. Production was stopped after filming six episodes. ABC was said to have spent millions on promotion, including airtime, billboards and radio ads, and considered Emily to be the 'linchpin' of the network's post-football Monday-night schedule. The promotion was so heavy and the cancellation so abrupt that some magazines found themselves carrying cover stories about a canceled show. After viewing it, ABC's entertainment president suggested that they considered the show lackluster and unlikely to improve.  The New York Times attributed the cancellation in part to the extremely unappealing nature of the main character and the portrayal by Heather Graham.Extra! Extra! Read All About It! (also known as Extra! Extra!): An Irish sitcom on RTÉ set in a newspaper office. It was poorly received, with critics stating that the scripts lacked any humour and that the direction was poor. Reviewing the programme for the Sunday Independent writer Colm Tóibín called it "probably the worst programme RTÉ has ever shown". The Irish Times Brendan Glacken was equally scathing: "Speaking of Extra! Extra!, as I am afraid we still must, even seasoned RTÉ observers seem unable to answer the question why a series so pathetically weak should have been allowed to reach the screen at all". Writing in the Connacht Sentinel, journalist Declan Tierney also gave the programme a harsh review: "to say that this is a pathetic attempt at comedy is being kind to "Extra! Extra! Read All About It!"" and stated "the only indication that it is a comedy comes from the canned laughter, which is over-done and often goes on for so long that it is impossible to hear the start of the next sentence". The Irish Independent later listed it as one of the worst Irish TV shows ever.

FFerris Bueller: The show (based on the hit 1986 John Hughes film Ferris Bueller's Day Off starring Matthew Broderick) received mostly negative reviews from critics. John J. O'Connor of The New York Times wrote that the version of Bueller portrayed by the "smirking" Charlie Schlatter "is likely to leave most viewers reaching instinctively for their wallets." Some critics considered Ferris Bueller one of the worst shows of the year. The show also had comparison to a show with a similar concept that debuted on Fox the same month, Parker Lewis Can't Lose. Parker Lewis proved to be more successful, lasting three seasons.The Flying Nun: This ABC sitcom about a nun (Sally Field) who is able to fly originally ran from September 7, 1967, to September 18, 1970, and today is considered a typical example of a 1960s sitcom based on a strange, cartoony premise, similar in style to Bewitched and My Mother the Car. To avoid any controversy, the producers delayed the release of the series by a year in order to obtain an approval from the Roman Catholic Church (which it did not object to after privately viewing the show first). Despite poor critical reception, it was quite popular with the audience and lasted for three seasons with a total of 82 episodes produced. Pilot Viruet of Flavorwire wrote: "The title reads like a throwaway joke from an episode of 30 Rock ... The Flying Nun isn't a punchline, though. It was a very real show, and even a somewhat successful one ..." MediaPost called it "one of the most unreal sitcoms of that period". However, while it was largely panned in its time, most of today's critics are more forgiving and praise the show for, despite its strange premise and plots, having a certain charm to it, with most praise going towards the performance and charm of Sally Field. Skooldays.com commented: "Even with all the wackiness going on, the lead actress's charm and multiple talents (she frequently sang on the show) kept the show grounded (except the Flying Nun herself, of course), and everything would be tied up with an uplifting moral by the show's end. ... The show's combination of unusual comedy and Field's charm kept viewers hooked. No matter which way the winds blow, The Flying Nun will always have a place in television history for managing to transform an offbeat premise into a successful and charming hit."

HHank: The show has been critically panned, scoring a 36/100 in Metacritic. The Los Angeles Times has noted "There's nothing here you couldn't imagine from the premise, but there's also nothing wrong with what's here: Melinda McGraw is a good foil for Kelsey Grammer, and Grammer is good at what he does." The New York Post panned the show: "Hank is one of the worst new (or old) comedies of this or many other seasons." It was cancelled after five episodes.Hardwicke House: Produced by Central Independent Television for the ITV network, this 1987 seven-episode sitcom set in a comprehensive school, and featured (in one episode only) Rik Mayall and Adrian Edmondson, became notorious for having such negative reception that it was cancelled after only two of seven episodes were aired on two consecutive days. The remaining five episodes have never been aired on television, but were uploaded on YouTube in 2019. The Daily Telegraph ranked it #9 on their list of the ten worst British sitcoms ever made.The Hathaways: This 1961–62 series followed the antics of a group of performing chimps and their agent. Latter-day television critics Castleman and Podrazik (1982) have called The Hathaways "possibly the worst series ever to air on network TV", criticizing the production, scripts, acting, the "utterly degrading" premise, and the overall "total worthlessness" of the program.Ein Haus voller Töchter ("A house full of daughters"): A 2010 sitcom produced by the small German channel Das Vierte as their first (and only) own fictional production. A very close adaptation of the popular Russian series Папины дочки (Daddy's Daughters), the show told the everyday life of a family therapist who has to care for his five daughters after being left by his wife. It was panned for its poor and clichéd writing, poor acting, poor timing and overuse of canned laughter. Jan Schlüter of Quotenmeter.de panned the show and concluded that "television could hardly get worse". It also received very poor ratings and was cancelled after only 35 of 48 episodes were broadcast.Heil Honey I'm Home!: This 1990 UK sitcom broadcast by the short-lived British Satellite Broadcasting depicted fictionalised versions of Adolf Hitler and Eva Braun living next to a stereotypical Jewish couple. The show was criticised for being unfunny and distasteful, and was cancelled after a single episode aired. One TV historian has described Heil Honey I'm Home! as "perhaps the world's most tasteless situation comedy". The Telegraph named it the 8th worst British sitcom ever made.Hello, Larry: Hello, Larry had the misfortune of appearing on NBC at a time when that network was at its nadir in the ratings (despite its poor quality, it lasted two seasons and 35 episodes). The show was greeted by viewers who had high expectations based on McLean Stevenson's M*A*S*H association, but quickly gained an extremely bad reputation as a weakly written, unfunny sitcom, and it was not helped by frequent ridicule from Johnny Carson in his monologues on The Tonight Show. It was used as a frequent punchline whenever a reference to a bad decision by an actor to leave a successful TV show was needed. In one example, Arianna Huffington said that "John McCain's return to the United States Senate will be the chilliest reception for a war hero since McLean Stevenson tried to talk his way back onto M*A*S*H after Hello Larry tanked." TV Guide ranked the series number 12 on TV Guide's 50 Worst Shows of All Time list in 2002.The Help: The premiere of The Help was the most watched program in the Friday 9:30–10:00 time slot on The WB in the 2003–04 season. The premiere was more popular among women than men aged 12–34 (2.0/8 versus 1.3/5). Despite the premiere being the best performance in the time slot of the season on The WB, the critics had nothing positive to say. Virginia Heffernan of The New York Times wrote the show "comes off like a school play, clumsily blocked, loudly acted and nearly shouted down by obligatory laughter and applause." Robert Bianco of USA Today pointed out that "this is the kind of show that opens with a doggie-doo joke and still finds a way to go downhill." Perhaps the most harsh was Matthew Gilbert of The Boston Globe: "The WB's claim that "The Help" is a "biting satire" is only half true. No, it's not a satire, but yes, it does indeed bite. And it will be biting the dust before long, unless it can find a new cast, new writers, new producers, a new set, and an entirely new premise." In her review of the 2003–04 season Kay McFadden, television critic for The Seattle Times, classified The Help as "Never should have aired".Hilfe, meine Familie spinnt ("Help, my family is crazy"): This German adaptation of Married...with Children first aired on RTL on 4 March 1993. Its scripts and sets were almost exact copies of the original American ones, lacking any cultural changes necessary to properly adapt it into German culture. Even the looks, facial expressions and gestures of the actors had to be exactly like those in the original US series. Further contributing to the series' failure was the fact that Married... with Children had already premiered in Germany a year before and was broadcast daily in the afternoon while Hilfe, meine Familie spinnt was broadcast once a week in the evening and on the same station. German newspaper Die Tageszeitung called it "very boring", while 20 years later in a retrospective article on the show, Der Spiegel wrote that it "couldn't work". Christian Richter of Quotenmeter.de called it "probably the most colourless comedy series on German television". Moviepilot.de ranked it #1 on a list of "Top 7 German comedy series crimes", commenting: "That 26 episodes of such garbage were made only shows that in German television not everything was always better in the past." The series received very poor ratings and was cancelled after the 26 episodes of the first season were broadcast.Hitz: Andrew Dice Clay came off the mis-step of Bless This House, only to find no success a season later with this UPN music industry-set sitcom. Caryn James of The New York Times called the series "relentlessly unfunny". Ken Tucker of Entertainment Weekly rated the series as one of the worst of the year.Homeboys in Outer Space: The series was panned by critics and was on TV Guides List of the 50 Worst TV Shows of All Time. Homeboys in Outer Space was cancelled in 1997 after 21 episodes.

IDas iTeam – Die Jungs an der Maus ('The iTeam - The Guys at the Mouse'): This German adaptation of the British programme The IT Crowd was produced in June 2007, starring Sky du Mont, Sebastian Münster, Stefan Puntigam and Britta Horn. The scripts were almost exact copies of the original British ones of the first season. The first episode was aired on 4 January 2008 on Sat.1 and received a mainly negative reception. It was criticized for the poor translation of the original stories and jokes, poor direction, poor timing and the poor performance of the actors, mainly Stefan Puntigam as Gabriel (the German version of Moss). Manuel Weis of Quotenmeter.de heavily panned the show, commenting: "It could indeed be possible that the boys of the class 10a from the secondary school of Brunsbüttel made the series. In short: In this form 'Das iTeam should never have come onto the screen. The look is strongly reminiscent of cheap crime documentaries in the afternoon and the actors are reminiscent of lousy Daytime formats. The climax of these catastrophes is ... Stefan Puntigam, who embodies the role of the computer geek Gabriel. ... his role seems artificial, exaggerated and in any case badly acted." The IT Crowd creator Graham Linehan noted in his blog that the first gag already does not work due to being wrongly executed. The show was cancelled after only two episodes due to low ratings. All episodes were later screened on Sat.1 Comedy though.

JJoanie Loves Chachi: This spin-off of the popular series Happy Days was a romantic musical comedy that has been negatively received by critics since its 17-episode run ended in 1983. Originally rated highly, network research suggested it was not rated well because of its own merits but was instead being propped up by its lead-in; the show's cast also cited a wholesale replacement in the writing staff with inferior, often drug-addicted writers who were unfamiliar with the show between its first and second seasons as another reason for the ratings plunge. It ranked #17 on TV Guides list of Biggest TV Blunders.

Ein Job fürs Leben ("A job for life"): This German remake of Who's the Boss? premiered on RTL on 4 March 1993, together with the also unsuccessful and critically panned Hilfe, meine Familie spinnt, and garnered largely negative reviews for the poor adaptation of the original US series. Even RTL CEO Marc Conrad was quoted saying: "That just does not seem funny." Christian Richter of Quotenemter.de called it a bland copy of the US original. Moviepilot.de ranked it #2 in its list of "Top 7 German comedy series crimes" only behind Hilfe, meine Familie spinnt, calling it "awkward, unfunny and unnecessary as a goiter". The series fared poorly in the ratings and was cancelled after one season.

K

Kath & Kim (2008): An American remake of the Australian series, the show generated criticism from fans and television critics, especially in the casting, adjusting of the tone of the show and even the show's costume design, which led to Selma Blair firing back over the claims that it ruins the creativity of the original. Early reviews of the pilot were poor, with the San Francisco Chronicle calling it "a contender for worst remake ever."

Kröd Mändoon and the Flaming Sword of Fire: This 2009 British-American Comedy Central co-production that was supposed to parody the sword and sorcery genre garnered largely negative reviews. Daniel Carlson of The Hollywood Reporter wrote: "Comedy Central's Krod Mandoon and the Flaming Sword of Fire is exactly as bad as you would fear. ... Instead of humor, creator Peter A. Knight settles for a horribly broad and purportedly 'wacky' level of high jinks that stopped being funny when you turned 15 and realized that the guy who keeps quoting Monty Python and the Holy Grail is not the guy you want to be." Tim Dowling of The Guardian wrote: "As an attempt to parody the sword-and-sorcery genre, Kröd Mändoon has some fundamental problems. First, it fails to demonstrate even a grudging respect for the thing it's taking the piss out of, which means it has all the internal logic, dramatic conviction and narrative thrust of a three-minute sketch. Secondly, it relies heavily on a single comic conceit, namely that the hopeless band of resistance fighters led by Kröd Mändoon spend most of their time bickering like office colleagues on an away-day team-building exercise. But the biggest problem is that Kröd Mändoon isn't very funny."

L

Land of Hope and Gloria: This short-lived 1992 ITV sitcom starring Sheila Ferguson was critically panned and is considered one of the worst British sitcoms ever made.

M
Mad About Alice: This 2004 BBC sitcom starring Amanda Holden and Jamie Theakston as a divorced couple with a young son received largely negative reviews and lasted for only one series. Digital Spy named it one of the five worst UK sitcoms and Vice discussed it in the first episode of its "ShitComs" series, a series on the worst sitcoms that lasted for only one series.

Man Up!: This ABC series received negative reviews, based on Metacritic's overall index, which placed the series at 36 out of 100. The Hollywood Reporters Tim Goodman noted that the actors are "just saddled in this sitcom world of limited potential", adding "How long can they play this joke?" and concluded that "Isn't it really time to let go of stereotypes and clichés and maybe write a sitcom that has more to joke about than one thing over and over again?" JAM! gave the series a "Thumbs Down", noting that "...if you're pining for the next great male sitcom, this isn't it." Varietys Brian Lowry noted that "...it'll take more than sociology to pump up this stale sitcom." The Oregonians Kristi Turnquist called the show "Unfunny" in her short review. Fantriads Matt Peterson found that among a mixed gender group of 25- to 34-year-olds, this show ranked among the top 5 of weekly watched television series. This group described this show as "a fresh take on comedy" and "laugh out loud funny", during online polls and questionnaires.

Melody Rules: Critically and commercially unsuccessful, this TV3 show has become part of the lexicon within the New Zealand television industry to describe an unsuccessful sitcom; for example: "That show will be the next Melody Rules." The series has been frequently labelled as "cringeworthy", and "atrocious" by The New Zealand Herald, one of New Zealand television's "disasters" by Scoop, and "awful" by the Waikato Times. Series co-stars Alan Brough and Belinda Todd both regret starring in the series; Todd described working on the series "... like Macbeth. I think that if you have to say [Melody Rules], you have to go around–you'd have to go outside and spin around because it's bad luck, don't you?" and labelled the series as "absolutely ghastly", while Brough described working on the series as "such a horrendous experience", adding "... I was so embarrassed by it, I had to go overseas." Both Brough and Todd claim the series was substantial in convincing them to leave New Zealand and move to Australia and the United States, respectively. The series has developed a cult following due to its poor quality. In 2019, Radio New Zealand produced an eight-episode podcast titled "The Worst Sitcom Ever Made" about the series and its failure, featuring interviews with the series' cast and crew.

The Melting Pot: This ill-fated BBC sitcom was written by and starred Spike Milligan, who played the character of Mr. Van Gogh, one of two Asian illegal immigrants shown as landing on a beach in Britain, and making it to a district of London known as "the melting pot". It was supposed to be a series of six episodes, but was cancelled after the screening of the first episode and the remaining five have never been broadcast.

Mitten im 8en ("In the Middle of the 8th"): This Austrian comedy drama soap produced by the ORF ran from 10 May to 29 June 2007. The "8th" in the title refers to Vienna's Josefstadt, the 8th district of Vienna. Repeatedly announced to be a core feature of the renewed programming by the ORF's new management and heavily promoted, the show received extremely bad ratings and devastating critical reception from the start, and was thus cancelled in the middle of its first season. After ratings dropped to often under 100,000 viewers, the show was cancelled after only about two months. Kronen Zeitung named it "one of the most infamous chapters in ORF TV history".

Mrs. Brown's Boys: Despite being a ratings success on the BBC in the UK and on RTÉ in Ireland, winning multiple awards, this British-Irish co-production has received almost entirely negative reviews from critics. It has been dubbed "The Worst Comedy Ever Made" and a review in the Irish Independent stated that Mrs Brown's Boys was the type of TV programme "that makes you vaguely embarrassed to be Irish" among other criticism from media in both countries.

My Mother the Car: Critics and adult viewers generally panned the show, often savagely. In 2002, TV Guide proclaimed it to be the second-worst of all time, just behind The Jerry Springer Show. My Mother the Car belonged to the genre of TV sitcoms popular at the time that featured supernatural characters and cartoonish situations, such as Bewitched, The Flying Nun and My Favorite Martian, but it failed and for many years afterward was widely ridiculed as the quintessential "worst show of all time", though many competitors have vied for that title since then.

N
New Monkees: Conceived as an updated version of the 1960s cult hit The Monkees with a new cast, New Monkees was pulled from air after only 13 weeks in first-run syndication. A corresponding tie-in album was also a commercial failure, all while the original Monkees were enjoying a popular resurgence through cable reruns and a new album. Among the reasons for the failure of New Monkees, both as a band and as a television show, were that attempting to emulate the cutting-edge approach of the 1960s series was not possible in the 1980s, as Generation X had a starkly different set of values compared to the Baby Boomers that watched the original show. The humor of New Monkees was compared unfavorably to other first-run syndicated sitcoms of the era that were also poorly received; in contrast to the original Monkees who were always portrayed as financially struggling, the New Monkees lived the high life in a huge mansion with servants and a talking computer.

Not My Department: The series premiered on October 2, 1987, on CBC Television's owned-and-operated stations, although some private affiliates aired it in an alternate time slot or failed to carry it at all. Its debut episode attracted 743,000 viewers, but critical reviews were highly unfavourable and the show almost immediately dropped fully a third of its initial audience, with just 498,000 viewers in the second week. The CBC cancelled the series on November 14, 1987, after just six episodes had aired.

O
Odd Man Out: Produced by Thames Television for ITV, this 1977 sitcom written by Vince Powell was intended as a solo vehicle for Are You Being Served? star John Inman, but was poorly received and lasted for only one series. The Daily Telegraph named it the third worst British sitcom ever.

On the Buses: Produced by London Weekend Television for ITV, this comedy about bus drivers received numerous negative reviews on transmission, and is often cited by British TV historians as one of the weakest of British sitcoms. In its section on situation comedies, The Guinness Book of Classic British TV describes On the Buses as ITV's "longest running and most self-consciously unfunny series". Victor Lewis-Smith later criticised Frank Muir, the then-head of LWT, for commissioning what Lewis-Smith called "the wretched On the Buses". Journalist Max Davidson, discussing 1970s British comedy, listed On the Buses as one of the "unfunny sitcoms of the time". The Guardian's David Stubbs referred to On the Buses as "a byword for 70s sitcom mediocrity".

One of the Boys: Despite a cast that included Mickey Rooney, Dana Carvey, Nathan Lane, Scatman Crothers and future star Meg Ryan in a recurring role, TV Guide named it one of the worst on "The 50 Worst Shows Ever" in 2002, ranking at #24. In an article about 1980s sitcoms, The A.V. Club described One of the Boys as a "truly atrocious waste of talent".

'Orrible: This 2001 BBC sitcom was written by and starred Johnny Vaughan as a cheeky chappy taxi-cab driver and wannabe small-time criminal in Acton, London. Despite the BBC being confident and heavily promoting the series, it was panned by critics for the script and Vaughan's acting ability. It achieved very low viewing figures, only ran for one series and has never been repeated by the BBC. Vaughan wasn't satisfied, later even saying about it: "Ultimately, it was shit". Digital Spy named it one of the UK's five worst sitcoms ever.

Out of This World: A syndicated TV sitcom about a young girl who discovers she is half-alien, Out of This World received strongly negative reviews. The book Television Without Pity contained a review of Out of this World that described the show as "quite possibly the worst sitcom ever made-it's a complete failure on every level". The review went on to disparage the show's scripts, acting and production, and unfavourably compared Out of this World to Sabrina, the Teenage Witch. The Splitsider website included Out of this World on a list of "Terrible Syndicated Sitcoms of the Late 1980s", along with Small Wonder, She's the Sheriff, Mama's Family and the 1987 adaptation of You Can't Take It with You. It also described Out of This World as "perhaps the worst sitcom ever, or at least the most '80s sitcom ever".

P

The Paul Reiser Show: This 2011 NBC single camera sitcom featuring former Mad About You star Paul Reiser was "critically panned", had the lowest-rated in-season premiere for a comedy series in the network's history, and was canceled after two episodes. Metacritic reported a rating of only 38 out of 100.  Emily VanDerWerff of The A.V. Club gave the show a D+, writing that it was best summarized by the word "complacent" and that "everything about it feels off-putting and weird."  She compared it unfavorably to Curb Your Enthusiasm, calling it a "weird copycat" that "takes most of the trappings of Curb but misses almost all of the soul.":

Public Morals: The original pilot episode of Public Morals was scrapped because critics and some CBS affiliates believed the language was too vulgar. However, the episode that did air was also poorly received. Critics argued that the characters were one-dimensional and that some of the humor involved racial stereotypes.

R
Real Rob: This sitcom created by and starring Rob Schneider premiered on December 1, 2015, on Netflix. The series follows the everyday life of Rob, including his real-life wife Patricia and daughter Miranda. It was met with a largely negative response from critics, holding a score of 36 on Metacritic based on 5 critic reviews, and a 0% rating on Rotten Tomatoes based on 8 critic reviews.

Rob: This 2012 CBS sitcom starring Rob Schneider as a former lifelong bachelor who marries into a Mexican-American family garnered largely negative reviews for its poor humor and use of stereotypes. Jace Lacob of The Daily Beast described it as "TV's worst new show" and wrote of the first episode that "there isn't a single Latin name among the writers or producers" and that it "offers a wafer-thin appreciation and awareness of Mexican culture, one that doesn't go beyond guacamole and the occasional use of the Spanish endearment mija (my daughter)." James Poniewozik of Time wrote: "¡Rob! is playing at a meta game in which it transmutes lame jokes about Hispanics into clever commentary by putting them in Rob's mouth, but that kind of strategy only works when the sitcom's world outside the lead character is not equally lame."

The Ropers: A failed spin-off of the highly successful Three's Company, this show was ranked number two on Time magazine's "Top 10 Worst TV Spin-Offs". It also ranked #49 on TV Guides list of "The 50 Worst Shows Ever" in 2002.

The Royal Bodyguard: Just hours after the broadcast of its first episode, this BBC sitcom was heavily criticised by fans of David Jason and viewers alike. Jim Shelley wrote "The Royal Bodyguard was, the BBC trumpeted, Sir David Jason's first Beeb comedy since Only Fools & Horses finished in 2002 – that was nine years ago. This fact alone should have alerted all involved to the fatal flaw at the heart of this debacle – namely that it was relying on the viewer's fondness for Del Boy. It was a classic example of blind faith in the production's star name. The prospect of seeing the 71-year-old star playing a former guardsman who had seen action in Northern Ireland and had now been appointed to the presumably prestigious position of royal bodyguard after saving the Queen's life stretched this fondness to breaking point. After about two minutes. Never mind that the plot's entire premise was stupid – that he was the incompetent former head of security at Buckingham Palace car park. The standard of the comedy was excruciating. It was blatantly designed to cash in on the appeal of characters like Inspector Clouseau and Johnny English. But the idea that Jason could play a clown as well as Peter Sellers or Rowan Atkinson was the only funny thing about it."

S

Saint George: Saint George is George Lopez's first starring role in a scripted series since his ABC show George Lopez. Upon airing, however, the show was met with very negative reception, citing the show's thin characters and "bad potty-humor jokes". The show was cancelled after one season.

Saved by the Bell: The New Class: Saved by the Bell: The New Class is a spin-off of the Saved by the Bell series, which ran from September 11, 1993, to January 8, 2000. The series lasted for seven seasons on NBC as a part of the network's TNBC Saturday morning line-up. It was the fourth incarnation of the franchise. The show had the same concept as the original series but featured a new group of students now roaming the halls of the fictional Bayside High School. Mr. Belding, played by Dennis Haskins, remained as the school's principal. Many of the stories were recycled plots of its parent series. The first-season cast included Robert Sutherland Telfer, Jonathan Angel, Isaac Lidsky, Natalia Cigliuti, Bianca Lawson, and Bonnie Russavage. Unlike the original series, which featured very few major cast changes throughout its run, The New Class regularly changed its core cast with Mr. Belding (and, beginning in the second season, original cast member Dustin Diamond reprising his role as Screech Powers) being the only constant factor. The series was universally panned by critics and most fans of the original series and is one of the worst reviewed teen shows, but had a positive reception to new fans of the franchise at first. Even so, by the end of the series, younger viewers had abandoned it; by its last season, the median age of The New Class and NBC's other children's programs was 41 years old, indicating the Nielsen Ratings were picking up viewers that had left the TV on after Weekend Today had ended, not people interested in the actual block itself. Unlike the other entries in the Saved by the Bell franchise (which included Good Morning, Miss Bliss, the flagship series, and The College Years in one syndication package), The New Class has never been rerun since its end in 2000; this despite it having a longer run under that name than the other three shows combined.

She's the Sheriff:  In 2002, She's the Sheriff starring Suzanne Somers was ranked #44 on TV Guides 50 Worst TV Shows of All Time. She's the Sheriff was also included on the Splitsider website's list of "Terrible Syndicated Sitcoms of the Late 1980s".

Sir Yellow: A little-remembered pseudo-medieval comedy, it was axed after just one series following bad reviews. In 2003, TV critic Mark Lewisohn named it as the worst British sitcom of all time in The Radio Times Guide to TV Comedy. The Daily Telegraph ranked it #5 in its list of the ten worst British sitcoms ever made.

Small Wonder: In 2002, Robert Bianco, TV critic for USA Today, listed this 1980s first-run syndicated sitcom about a robot being passed off as a human girl as a contender for one of the worst TV shows of all time, and according to the BBC, it "is widely considered one of the worst low-budget sitcoms of all time." In the DVD audio commentary for the South Park episode "Simpsons Already Did It", co-creator Matt Stone lamented that "for some reason, people lump South Park and The Simpsons and any animated program together... which is unfortunate that we have to be compared to one of the best shows on television ever and one of the most popular shows on television ever, we never get compared to Sister, Sister or Small Wonder." South Park did a reverse parody of Small Wonder's plot in the season 8 episode "Awesom-O", which featured Eric Cartman disguising himself as a robot in order to learn of Butters' most embarrassing secrets for blackmail purposes.

T

The Tammy Grimes Show: In 1966, Tammy Grimes starred in her own ABC television series, in which she played a modern-day heiress who loved to spend money. Receiving "unfavorable critical reaction and poor ratings", it ran for only a month, although an additional six episodes had already been made. At the time, cancelling a scripted show before a season was complete was unusual, and after only four episodes almost unprecedented; The Tammy Grimes Show was one of the shortest-lived series of its era.

Tanken – mehr als Super: This German adaption of the Icelandic sitcom Næturvaktin premiered on 31 July 2018 on ZDF Neo and garnered mostly negative reviews. Jana Bärenwaldt of Fernsehserien.de found the program "more than super-bad", wrote the "import format lacks any originality" and gave it a rating of 0.5 out of 5 stars. David Segler of the Frankfurter Rundschau described the program as a "joke figure cabaret" and "nasty sitcom dumpling" and wrote "It's quite impressive how long 25 minutes can feel. In the trivial slapstick farce of Tanken they become an eternity." Die Zeit wrote: "If ZDF adapts a ten-year-old Icelandic format and sells it as a new comedy offensive, it must be quite desperate. ... Unfortunately, the fictional "Super" gas station on ZDFneo lacks any laconic wit, even though the team ... certainly has potential. The actors remain condemned to work through standard situations with predictable dialogue ..." Julian Miller of Quotenmeter.de also gave it a largely negative review and wrote '''Tanken has nothing to offer but the obvious ... The series is told as if there had been no progress in terms of content, no new impulses since the days of Rita's Welt. That is not super, at most E10."Теоретики (The Theorists): An unlicensed Belarusian copy of The Big Bang Theory that aired on Belarusian state channel STV in late 2009. The show featured "clones" of the main characters, a similar opening sequence, and what appears to be a very close Russian translation of the scripts. Chuck Lorre expressed annoyance and described his inquiry with the Warner Bros. legal department about options. The television production company and station's close relationship with the Belarus government were cited as the reason that any attempt to claim copyright infringement would be in vain because the company copying the episodes is operated by the government. However, no legal action was required to end production of the show: as soon as it became known that the show was unlicensed, the actors quit and the producers canceled it. Dmitriy Tankovich (who plays Leonard's counterpart, "Seva") said in an interview "I'm upset. At first, the actors were told all legal issues were resolved. We didn't know it wasn't the case, so when the creators of The Big Bang Theory started talking about the show, I was embarrassed. I can't understand why our people first do, and then think. I consider this to be the rock bottom of my career. And I don't want to take part in a stolen show".The Trouble with Larry: Larry (Bronson Pinchot) returns home a decade after he was dragged off by baboons on his honeymoon, in this 1993 sitcom also starring a pre-Friends Courteney Cox. Ken Tucker of Entertainment Weekly called the show "not just not-funny, but actively depressing". Hal Boedeker, writing for the Knight Ridder newspaper chain, opined that "the moronic sitcom was beyond bad, a disaster that raises doubts about the judgement of CBS executives." David Zurawik of The Baltimore Sun called the show juvenile, and wondered "How did this sitcom (using the word in its most expansive sense) ever make it on the CBS fall schedule?" Frazier Moore of The Seattle Post-Intelligencer wrote that "The Trouble with Larry is a sitcom so feeble yet brazen in its humormongering that it nearly takes the viewer's breath away." The Orlando Sentinels Greg Dawson praised the show's "first-rate" cast, but attacked the pilot's "dead-in-the-water writing" and "nonstop witlesscisms", and called the finished product "sophomoric dreck ... which tests the self-control of anyone with an IQ over 50 and a sledgehammer or handgun in the house." CBS tried premiering the series a few weeks in advance of the 1993 TV season in order to give the show a ratings boost. After blistering reviews and three weeks of bad ratings, The Trouble with Larry was canceled before the official TV season of which it was to be a part of had even begun.The Trouble with Tracy: This Canadian sitcom was hastily assembled in 1970 to comply with upcoming Canadian content requirements and had an extremely limited budget for both time and money. 130 episodes of the series were produced, requiring scripts to be recycled from 1940s radio dramas, line mistakes to be kept in the finished product due to time and money constraints, and virtually the entire series shot from one small living-room set. As a result of the poor-quality end product, the series is often considered one of the worst of all time.Two Pints of Lager and a Packet of Crisps: Despite being successful with viewers and staying on the air for ten years, from 26 February 2001 to 24 May 2011, with a total of nine series and 80 episodes, the BBC sitcom always received a strongly negative critical response. The Guardian wrote that it was "universally panned". Den of Geek called it "the worst show to ever hit TV screens in the last ten years". Digital Spy named it one of the five worst sitcoms to ever come off the UK.Tyler Perry's House of Payne: The national premiere received 5.9 million viewers in June 2007—at the time, basic cable's biggest sitcom audience ever. The show remained basic cable's top-rated first run sitcom until TBS's August 2008 premiere of sister series Meet the Browns. For the first quarter of 2011, House of Payne and Meet the Browns ranked among television's five highest-rated primetime sitcoms with African-American adults aged 18–34 and 25–49. However, the program has received mostly negative reviews. Paul Katz of Entertainment Weekly wrote the program had a "bleak premise" and referred to the laugh track as "grating."  He also wrote that "(Tyler) Perry should unleash Madea on the Payne household. They could use the laugh." Movie Web wrote: "I try not to be cynical about TV shows, particularly sitcoms. I know how hard it is to try to write a funny, relevant and interesting television show. I also know that it takes a perfect storm of talent, writing and zeitgeist to capture these elements for an audience. Sadly, Tyler Perry's House of Payne fails to do so." Ginia Bellefante of The New York Times commented on the sitcom's "narrative aimlessness and languorous pacing", and criticized what she saw as unexplained turns towards topicality.  Bellefante did note that House of Payne had "the effect of affirming the progressiveness of a show like Norman Lear's Good Times." Varietys Phil Gallo wrote: "In the first episode, House of Payne rolls through a collection of stereotypes and characters familiar to TV auds. ...It's old-fashioned in structure, sets and characters. Despite having his name in the title, Payne is straitjacketed into a straight-man role; the saving grace is the grumpy father figure Chester as Davis huffs and puffs his way through the unnatural dialogue. As the mother Ella, Cassi Davis is all exaggeration—from the bug eyes to the girth—and she isn't given the material to make her character either outrageously humorous or poignantly comforting. She doesn't seem particularly real." Tom Shales of The Washington Post wrote: "Three generations of an African American family share—sometimes—what looks like an enormous house in the Atlanta suburbs, and things sort of happen to them. Some things happen repeatedly, such as the patriarch of the family telling everybody to 'get out' or 'go home,' apparently desiring the company of none of them...At times one wishes that, yes, House were Payne-less...(T)he program has a long way to go before jelling as a believable unit...(T)he acting styles conflict or seem barely to exist." Shales also criticized the program for some of the subject matter, such as Janine's crack addiction, stating that "It's commendable to try to introduce serious and topical material in sitcoms, but the way it's done here is awkward and cringe-inducing." Common Sense Media gave it rating of 2 out of 5 stars.

WWe Are Men: This show had been promoted for over two years as Tony Shalhoub's return to television. Reviews were negative, on Metacritic it had a score of 33 out of 100; on Rotten Tomatoes has a rating of 4% for the program. Melissa Maers of Entertainment Weekly wrote that the show was "The male version of Sex and the City with more shirtless scenes (courtesy of Jerry O'Connell) and way less wit", while The Hollywood Reporter was much more harsh, writing "We Are Men is about four single guys you wouldn't ever want to be around or be related to in any way ... [it] made me feel stupid almost immediately and then bitter that I'd wasted the time." The show failed to catch an audience and actually adversely affected other programming, especially the program 2 Broke Girls. The show got the lowest rating of any premiere on CBS and was axed after just two episodes.We Got It Made: When it first premiered, it appeared We Got It Made would be successful, winning its time slot early in the run. But before long, negative reviews from both critics and the general viewing public eroded its viewership. NBC moved the series from its original Thursday night berth to Saturdays in January 1984. The change in its night and time did little in keeping the series on the air; in March 1984, We Got It Made was canceled. We Got It Made was revived in first-run syndication for the 1987–1988 season as part of NBC's "Prime Time Begins at 7:30" campaign, in which the network's owned-and-operated stations ran first-run sitcoms in the 7:30–8 pm time slot to counterprogram competing stations' game shows, sitcom reruns and other offerings. However, the series was picked up by non-NBC stations as well. As they had with the NBC version, critics lambasted the series, and We Got It Made lasted only one season in syndication. The series' final original episode was released on March 30, 1988, with reruns airing until the week of September 3, 1988 in most markets.Work It: The 2012 ABC cross-dressing sitcom was panned by critics, receiving a Metacritic rating of 19. The show was cancelled after two episodes. Matt Fowler of IGN gave the pilot 0/10, IGN's first zero rating since 2005. Emily VanDerWerff of The A.V. Club gave the pilot an F, calling the show "fascinatingly awful, in that way where you wonder how the hell something like this got on TV in the year 2012". Linda Holmes of NPR called Work It "pointlessly crass, utterly clichéd, sexist toward both men and women, and hopelessly, painfully unfunny from wire to wire". James Poniewozik of Time described Work It as "the kind of bad dumb show you will use in years to come as a benchmark for other bad sitcoms". Alan Sepinwall gave the show his very rare distinction of writing a lengthy review where he assigned it an "F" grade, whereas he usually won't publish any reviews of a series he hates and will simply note via short non-review entries (or on Twitter) how bad they are.The Wright Way: A 2013 BBC TV sitcom by Ben Elton starring David Haig as the director of the health and safety department of the fictional Baselricky Council implied to be in Essex. The first episode received negative reviews from critics. The second episode was heavily criticised by Tom Phillips in the New Statesman, who found it to be even worse than the first. Adam Postans in the Daily Mirror called it 'the worst sitcom ever'. Oliver Nagel of German blog britcoms.de included it in an article on "The Shitcoms of the year", commenting: "Worst. Sitcom. Ever.", "Gags that can hardly be described as such, dogmatism that speculates on approving laughter, gruesome characters – really everything is wrong here" and "With 'The Wright Way' Ben Elton has reached the very bottom."

YYus, My Dear''': The series, which gained modest ratings, has the reputation of being one of the worst ever sitcoms. Stuart Heritage from The Guardian'' named it one of the worst ITV programmes ever made.

References

External links
TV's 10 most maligned sitcoms
The 25 Least Funny Sitcoms Of All Time
The 52 worst sitcoms of all time

Sitcoms
Sitcoms
Sitcoms